Barossa may refer to:


Places
Barossa Valley, a valley in South Australia
Electoral district of Barossa
Hundred of Barossa, a cadastral unit in South Australia
Barossa Goldfields, South Australia, also in the same area
 Barrosa (Portugal), a parish of Portugal
Playa de la Barrosa, a beach in Spain

Ships
 – any one of four vessels of the British Royal Navy
SS Barossa, a cargo ship built for the Adelaide Steamship Company in 1938

Other uses
Barossa project, a proposed natural gas field off the coast of Darwin, Northern Territory, Australia

See also